Medfield is a neighborhood located in north Baltimore, Maryland, United States of America. It is located to the north of the trendy Hampden neighborhood and south of affluent Roland Park neighborhood. Its unofficial boundaries are Coldspring Lane to the north; Jones Falls Expressway (Interstate 83) to the west; Falls Road/Hickory Avenue to the east; and West 41st Street to the south.

History
Part of Medfield was built on the grounds of the Medfield Academy, a 19th-century prep school believed to have stood near 42nd Street west of Falls Road. Baltimore annexed the southern half of Medfield in 1888 and the northern half in 1918.

Most of Medfield was developed from the 1920s through the 1960s. The southern section of the neighborhood (that adjacent to Hampden) and the northern section (off of Cold Spring Lane) were the first areas to be developed. The middle was developed from the 1940s - 1950s. Many of the first residents of Medfield were longtime residents of Hampden, who wished to move into newer houses, some of which had larger yards.  Many of such residents still refer to the area as "Lower Roland Park".

Despite the suburban flight and subsequent urban decay experienced in Baltimore starting in the 1950s, Medfield continued to be a desirable and comparatively safe neighborhood for blue-collar and middle-class families. As a result of urban renewal efforts and the "boom" in the housing market experienced in the 2000s, the neighborhood received much investment and rehabilitation, and thus attracted an increased amount of young professionals. There are currently several new development projects occurring in and around Medfield.

Medfield is currently in the Baltimore City 7th and 14th City Council District. The Medfield Community Association is a volunteer organization that represents the neighborhood, whose mission is to empower the community to improve quality of life through communication, engagement, participation, and advocacy.

Housing stock
Medfield contains a variety of types of houses, far more variety than most Baltimore neighborhoods. Most of the neighborhood consists of brick rowhomes, most of which include front porches. There are also many single-family detached houses throughout the neighborhood, as well as several apartment buildings.

Schools
Medfield is home to Medfield Heights Elementary School, which boasts test scores above city/state averages. The neighborhood is also adjacent to the campuses of Baltimore Polytechnic Institute and Western High School, two well-regarded public magnet schools.

The community is also about 1 mile from Loyola University Maryland and about 2 miles from Johns Hopkins University Homewood Campus.

Parks and Recreation
Medfield Heights Park is located directly behind Medfield Heights Elementary School, and is overseen by the Principal of the Elementary School. This park contains 2 baseball fields, basketball courts, and green space. The neighborhood is also walking distance to several parks in Hampden (Roosevelt Park on Falls Road and W. 36th Street; and Buena Vista Park on West 42nd Street at Buena Vista Avenue). It is also about 2 miles from Lake Roland Park in Baltimore County.

Adjacent to the Medfield Heights Park is the Medfield Heights Recreation Center, which is managed by the Baltimore City Department of Recreation and Parks.  The facility received a complete renovation in 2009.

Transportation
Medfield is easily accessible by many methods of transportation. The community is located directly off of Exit 9 of the Jones Falls Expressway (I-83), and is walking distance from the Cold Spring Lane station of the Baltimore Light Rail, and several bus lines.  Additionally, the Blue Jay Shuttle of Johns Hopkins University provides service to students in the neighborhood via its Blue and Pink lines.

Pending development
A development of 43 market-rate townhomes is underway at the edge of Medfield, called Skyview.  Additionally, plans to redevelop the nearby Rotunda have been completed after being on hold for several years.  The redevelopment includes approximately 300 market rate apartments and several restaurants and shops, including MOM's Organic Market and CineBistro movie theater.

Called part of Greater Hampden, several industrial sites have been targeted for development for residential townhomes and apartments. The largest is planned for the PepsiCo plant on Union Avenue, next to the Jones Falls.

Additionally, a community group involving residents of the Medfield, Hampden, and Woodbery neighborhoods has explored the construction of a dog park at Buena Vista Park.

References 

Neighborhoods in Baltimore
Northern Baltimore